Marumagan is a 1995 Indian Tamil-language drama film directed by Manivasagam. The film stars Karthik and Meena. It was released on 7 July 1995 and failed at the box office.

Plot 

After working in Bombay as a tailor, Thangarasu comes back to home and opens a tailor shop in his neighbourhood. His speciality is taking measurements without touching the women, his shop becomes quickly very popular among the women. Thangarasu falls in love with Manjula, the daughter of Mayilsamy Gounder. Mayilsamy Gounder, an ex-Member of Parliament and an illicit liquor smuggler,  plans a return to politics. In the meantime, Thangarasu and Manjula announce their love on a TV Channel. Mayilsamy Gounder is first angry but he uses this opportunity to win the upcoming election. Everything was fine until that Thangarasu's mother Thaiyamma learns the news and she objects for the marriage. What transpires later forms the crux of the story.

Cast 

Karthik as Thangarasu
Meena as Manjula
Radha Ravi as Mayilsamy Gounder
Nagesh
Goundamani as Govindsamy
Senthil
Manorama as Thaiyamma
R. Sundarrajan as Muniyandi
Ponnambalam
Kumarimuthu as Arumugam
Suryakanth as Sengaliappan
Chitti
Sangeeta
Kokila
Lalitha Kumari as Kannamma
Singamuthu
Tirupur Ramasamy
Kovai Senthil
Chitraguptan
Veerapathiran
Periya Karuppu Thevar
Jeeva
Rajavanan

Soundtrack 

The music was composed by Deva, with lyrics written by Vairamuthu.

Reception 
R. P. R. of Kalki said he could not say the film is boring but felt the director could have avoided dealing with a script which offered boredom and fatigue.

References

External links 

1990s Tamil-language films
1995 films
Films directed by Manivasagam
Films scored by Deva (composer)